Diguetia albolineata is a species of desertshrub spider in the family Diguetidae. It is found in the United States and Mexico.

References

Diguetidae
Spiders of Mexico
Spiders of the United States
Spiders described in 1895
Taxa named by Octavius Pickard-Cambridge
Articles created by Qbugbot